John Farrell (born 30 July 1954) is a New Zealand former sports shooter. He competed in the mixed skeet event at the 1988 Summer Olympics.

References

External links
 

1954 births
Living people
New Zealand male sport shooters
Olympic shooters of New Zealand
Shooters at the 1988 Summer Olympics
Sportspeople from Dannevirke
Commonwealth Games medallists in shooting
Commonwealth Games bronze medallists for New Zealand
Shooters at the 1986 Commonwealth Games
20th-century New Zealand people
21st-century New Zealand people
Medallists at the 1986 Commonwealth Games